Protoanemonin (sometimes called anemonol or ranunculol) is a toxin found in all plants of the buttercup family (Ranunculaceae). When the plant is wounded or macerated, the unstable glucoside found in the plant, ranunculin, is enzymatically broken down into glucose and the toxic protoanemonin. It is the lactone of 4-hydroxy-2,4-pentadienoic acid.

Contact with a wounded plant causes itch, rashes or blistering on contact with the skin or mucosa. Ingesting the toxin can cause nausea, vomiting, dizziness, spasms, acute hepatitis, jaundice, or paralysis.

When drying the plant, protoanemonin comes into contact with air and dimerizes to anemonin, which is further hydrolyzed to a non-toxic dicarboxylic acid.

Biological pathway

References

Furanones
Plant toxins
Ranunculaceae
Vinylidene compounds